José Pedro Malheiro de Sá (born 17 January 1993) is a Portuguese professional footballer who plays as a goalkeeper for Premier League club Wolverhampton Wanderers.

He started his career with Marítimo B, making his debut with the first team in 2013, before signing for FC Porto in 2016. Sá was loaned for one year to Super League Greece side Olympiacos in 2018, in a deal which was made permanent at the end of the season. With Olympiacos, he won two Super League Greece titles and the Greek Football Cup, including a domestic double in 2020. In 2021, he signed with Wolverhampton Wanderers.

Sá is a former Portuguese under-21 international, reaching the European Championship final in 2015. He was part of the full squad that finished third at the 2017 Confederations Cup and won the 2019 UEFA Nations League Finals on home soil, and was also chosen for the 2022 World Cup.

Club career

Marítimo
Born in Braga, Sá went from Merelinense to the youth ranks of Benfica in January 2011, and moved six months later to Madeira's Marítimo to finish his development at the age of 18. On 23 January 2013 he made his professional debut with the B team, playing the full 90 minutes in a 0–0 home draw against Oliveirense in the Segunda Liga championship.

In the 2013 off-season, Sá was promoted to the main squad by manager Pedro Martins. He played his first game in the Primeira Liga on 18 August in a 2–1 home win over Benfica, and kept his position for the following matchday, a 3–0 loss at Porto.

During his tenure in Funchal, Sá acted as understudy to Frenchman Romain Salin.

Porto
On 25 January 2016, both Sá and teammate Moussa Marega joined Porto on four-and-a-half-year contracts, with the services of the former being acquired for €1.5 million. During his early spell, he was second choice to Spain international Iker Casillas.

Sá made his debut in the UEFA Champions League on 17 October 2017, starting in a 3–2 loss for the group stage away to RB Leipzig and committing a blunder in the eighth minute which resulted in the opposition's first goal. He became the starter from that point onwards but, following a 5–0 home defeat against Liverpool in the same competition, lost his place again.

Olympiacos

On 31 August 2018, deemed surplus to requirements by manager Sérgio Conceição, Sá joined Olympiacos on a season-long loan. He became first choice over Andreas Gianniotis shortly after arriving, as the team was coached by his compatriot and former Marítimo boss Martins.

On 15 May 2019, Sá agreed to a permanent four-year deal. During the campaign, he kept a total of 18 clean sheets as the team from Piraeus won the double, though he missed the Cup final through injury.

Sá was again a league winner in 2020–21. However, his team were beaten to the Cup by PAOK.

Wolverhampton Wanderers
On 15 July 2021, Sá joined English club Wolverhampton Wanderers for a €8 million transfer fee, on a five-year deal; he was signed to replace his experienced compatriot Rui Patrício who had joined Roma, and he was handed the number 1 jersey that had not been worn at the Molineux club since Carl Ikeme retired due to his leukaemia diagnosis in 2018.

Sá made his Premier League debut on 14 August 2021 in a 1–0 loss away to Leicester City. In September, he provided an assist for Raúl Jiménez against Southampton in their 1–0 win, making him the first Wolves goalkeeper to do so in the Premier League since Wayne Hennessey in October 2009. His string of good all-round performances, including his distribution and shot stopping helped Wolves to a run of three clean sheets, earning the club's Player of the Month, with former Manchester United player Gary Neville praising Sá as the signing of the season. On 11 November, despite losing 1–0 to Manchester City, Sá received several praises for his performance, making several vital saves, despite Wolves being reduced to 10 men just before half-time, only failing to defend a penalty. On 15 May 2022, Sá won both Wolves's Fans' Player of the 2021–22 Season, and the Players' Player of the 2021–22 Season awards.

On 14 October 2022 it was revealed that Sá had been playing for two months with a fractured wrist sustained during a 0–0 home draw with Fulham in the second match of the season, a game in which he saved a penalty from Aleksandar Mitrović – the first penalty save he had made in a Wolves shirt since joining the club. The following day, he saved another penalty from Brennan Johnson in a 1–0 home win against Nottingham Forest, with ten minutes remaining.

International career

Youth
Sá represented Portugal at the 2013 FIFA U-20 World Cup. He played all the matches and minutes in Turkey, in an eventual round-of-16 exit.

On 6 August 2013, Sá received his first call-up to the under-21 team, for a friendly game with Switzerland. He featured in the second half of the 5–2 win, on the 14th. Sá was first choice at the 2015 UEFA European Under-21 Championship, keeping clean sheets in all games but one as the national side finished in second place in the Czech Republic; in the final, he saved from Sweden's Abdul Khalili in the penalty shootout following a goalless draw at the Eden Arena.

Senior
On 25 May 2017, Sá was called to the full side for the first time, being named by manager Fernando Santos in a provisional 24-man squad for that year's FIFA Confederations Cup. Still uncapped, he was part of the squad that won the 2019 UEFA Nations League Finals on home soil in June but did not make an appearance.

Sá was chosen for the 2022 FIFA World Cup in Qatar.

Career statistics

Club

Honours
Porto B
LigaPro: 2015–16

Porto
Primeira Liga: 2017–18

Olympiacos
Super League Greece: 2019–20, 2020–21
Greek Football Cup: 2019–20

Portugal
UEFA Nations League: 2018–19
FIFA Confederations Cup third place: 2017

Individual
UEFA European Under-21 Championship Team of the Tournament: 2015
Primeira Liga Goalkeeper of the Month: December 2017
Super League Greece Goalkeeper of the Year: 2019–20
Super League Greece Team of the Year: 2019–20

References

External links

Profile at the Wolverhampton Wanderers F.C. website

1993 births
Living people
Sportspeople from Braga
Portuguese footballers
Association football goalkeepers
Primeira Liga players
Liga Portugal 2 players
C.S. Marítimo players
FC Porto B players
FC Porto players
Super League Greece players
Olympiacos F.C. players
Premier League players
Wolverhampton Wanderers F.C. players
Portugal youth international footballers
Portugal under-21 international footballers
2017 FIFA Confederations Cup players
2022 FIFA World Cup players
UEFA Nations League-winning players
Portuguese expatriate footballers
Expatriate footballers in Greece
Expatriate footballers in England
Portuguese expatriate sportspeople in Greece
Portuguese expatriate sportspeople in England